LMB is the abbreviation of: 

 La Martiniere College for Boys, Kolkata
 Laboratory of Molecular Biology, a research institute in Cambridge, England
 Left Mouse Button on a mouse (computing)
 Leptomycin B, an inhibitor of protein export from the cell nucleus
 Liga Mexicana de Beisbol, the Mexican Baseball League
 Line Mode Browser, the first multi-platform web browser
 Lois McMaster Bujold, science fiction and fantasy author